Imperfect High is a 2021 drama film produced by Lifetime and starring Nia Sioux, Sherri Shepherd, Gabriel Darku and Ali Skovbye. The film premiered on September 18, 2021 on Lifetime. The film is a sequel to the 2015 movie Perfect High, which stars Bella Thorne, Israel Broussard, Daniela Bobadilla and Ross Butler.

Cast

Nia Sioux as	Hanna Brooks
Gabriel Darku	as	Dylan
Ali Skovbye as Rose
Anthony Timpano as	Rob
Samuel Braun as Blake
Sherri Shepherd as Deborah
Andrew McNee as Mr. Arnet
Princess Davis as Marcy
Danyelle Tan as Fay
Melice Bell as Fay
Jamall Johnson as Principal Andrews
Deborah Finkel as Nurse O'Connor
Ecstasia Sanders as Administrator
Miguel Castillo as Officer Mike
Aiden Howard as Cy
Matt Kennedy as Ben
Eddie Canelea as Waiter

Production

References

Canadian television films
American television films